Scythropiodes oncinius is a moth in the family Lecithoceridae. It was described by Kyu-Tek Park and Chun-Sheng Wu in 1997. It is found in Hainan, China.

The wingspan is 15–17 mm. The forewings are yellowish brown with a row covered with yellowish scales along the costal margin. The hindwings are light yellowish white.

Etymology
The species name is derived from Greek onkinos (meaning a hook).

References

Moths described in 1997
Scythropiodes